Markus Laubenthal is a Generalmajor in the German Army and the Chief of Staff of U.S. Army Europe, the first non-American to hold that post.
He was born on December 4, 1962, in Aachen, Germany.

Career
Before his appointment to this post in 2014 he commanded the Bundeswehr's 12th Armored Brigade in Amberg. He is widowed with a son. In August 2013, he took over as chief of staff for ISAF Regional Command North in Afghanistan, where he helped oversee the drawdown of German troops from Kunduz and Mazar-e-Sharif, according to information on the German army website. Before his service as a commander in Amberg he was the head of the Political Department of the Ministry of Defense. In the official statement of the Bundeswehr on the new German post he said:

References

Living people
1962 births
Major generals of the German Army
Military personnel from Aachen
Foreign recipients of the Legion of Merit